Barreiros may refer to:

People with the surname
 João Barreiros (born 1952), Portuguese writer, editor, translator and critic
 Quim Barreiros (born 1947), Portuguese singer and songwriter
 Ricardo Barreiros (born 1982), Portuguese roller hockey player
 Susana Barreiros (born 1981), Venezuelan judge

Places

Brazil
 Barreiros, Pernambuco, a municipality in the State of Pernambuco
 Barreiros River (Mato Grosso do Sul)
 Barreiros River (Tocantins)

Portugal
 Barreiros (Amares), a civil parish in the municipality of Amares
 Barreiros, Póvoa de Varzim
 Barreiros (Mirando do Douro), a civil parish in the municipality of Miranda do Douro
 Barreiros (Valpaços), a civil parish in the municipality of Valpaços 
 Barreiros (Viseu), a civil parish in the municipality of Viseu
 Estádio dos Barreiros, a multi-purpose stadium in Funchal

Spain
 Barreiros, Lugo, a municipality of the Province of Lugo

Other
 Barreiros (manufacturer), a Spanish manufacturer of tractors, trucks and cars

See also 
 Barreiro (disambiguation)

Portuguese-language surnames